Ricardo Winicki Santos (born 8 May 1980 in Rio de Janeiro) is a Brazilian windsurfer. He has competed at the Olympics since 2000, firstly in the Mistral One Design Class, and currently the RS:X (sailboard).

Results

References

External links
 
 
 
 

1980 births
Living people
Brazilian male sailors (sport)
Brazilian windsurfers
Olympic sailors of Brazil
Sailors at the 2000 Summer Olympics – Mistral One Design
Sailors at the 2004 Summer Olympics – Mistral One Design
Sailors at the 2008 Summer Olympics – RS:X
Sailors at the 2012 Summer Olympics – RS:X
Sailors at the 2016 Summer Olympics – RS:X
Pan American Games gold medalists for Brazil
Pan American Games silver medalists for Brazil
Sailors at the 1999 Pan American Games
Sailors at the 2003 Pan American Games
Sailors at the 2007 Pan American Games
Sailors at the 2011 Pan American Games
Sailors at the 2015 Pan American Games
Sportspeople from Rio de Janeiro (city)
Pan American Games medalists in sailing
Medalists at the 1999 Pan American Games
Medalists at the 2003 Pan American Games
Medalists at the 2007 Pan American Games
Medalists at the 2011 Pan American Games
Medalists at the 2015 Pan American Games
RS:X class world champions